Luís Mário Miranda da Silva or simply Luís Mário (born November 1, 1976 in Vigia-PA), is a Brazilian striker.

Club career
He played for FC Seoul of the South Korean K League, then known as Anyang LG Cheetahs.

Honours
Rio de Janeiro's Cup: 2007

References

 CBF Profile 
 Sambafoot Profile

External links
 

1976 births
Living people
Association football forwards
Brazilian footballers
Brazilian expatriate footballers
Clube do Remo players
Mogi Mirim Esporte Clube players
Sport Club Corinthians Paulista players
Grêmio Foot-Ball Porto Alegrense players
FC Seoul players
Coritiba Foot Ball Club players
Vitória S.C. players
Clube Atlético Mineiro players
Associação Atlética Ponte Preta players
Botafogo de Futebol e Regatas players
FC St. Gallen players
Criciúma Esporte Clube players
Esporte Clube Santo André players
Agremiação Sportiva Arapiraquense players
Macaé Esporte Futebol Clube players
Clube Atlético Bragantino players
K League 1 players
Primeira Liga players
Swiss Super League players
Expatriate footballers in South Korea
Expatriate footballers in Portugal
Expatriate footballers in Switzerland
Sportspeople from Pará
Brazilian expatriate sportspeople in South Korea
Brazilian expatriate sportspeople in Portugal
Brazilian expatriate sportspeople in Switzerland